The Bituriges Cubi (Gaulish: Biturīges Cubi) were a Gallic tribe dwelling in a territory corresponding to the later province of Berry, which is named after them, during the Iron Age and the Roman period. They had a homonym tribe, the Bituriges Vivisci, in the Bordelais region, which could indicate a common origin, although there is no direct evidence of this.

Name 
They are mentioned as Bituriges by Caesar (mid-1st c. BC), Bitoúriges oi̔ Kou͂boi (Βιτούριγες οἱ Κοῦβοι) and Koúbois Bitoúrixi (Κούβοις Βιτούριξι) by Strabo (early 1st c. AD), Bituriges ... qui Cubi appellantur by Pliny (1st c. AD), and as Bitoúriges oi̔ Kou͂boi (Βιτούριγες οἱ Κοῦβοι) by Ptolemy (2nd c. AD).

The Gaulish ethnonym Biturīges means 'kings of the world', or possibly 'perpetual kings'. It derives from the stem bitu- ('world', perhaps also 'perpetual'; cf. OIr. bith 'world, life, age', bith- 'eternally', Old Welsh bid, OBret. bit 'world') attached to riges ('kings'; sing. rix). Whether the meaning 'perpetual' was already associated with bitu- in ancient Celtic languages or appeared later in Old Irish remains uncertain. In any case, the meaning 'world' probably emerged from the notion of 'living world, place of the livings', since the Proto-Celtic stem *bitu- derives from Proto-Indo-European *gʷiH-tu-, meaning 'life' (cf. Lat. vīta 'life', OCS žiti 'to live').

The city of Bourges, attested ca. 400 AD as civitas Biturigum ('civitas of the Bituriges', Bituricas in 844, Bituris in 1182), and the region of Berry, attested in 860 as pagus Biturigus ('pagus of the Bituriges'), are named after the Gallic tribe.

Geography 

Their chief town during the pre-Roman era was the oppidum of Avaricum Biturigum (modern Bourges). Their dwelled west of the Aedui, south of the Carnutes and Cenomani, north of the Pictones, Lemovices and Arverni, and east of the Turones.

History 
According to a legend recounted by Livy, the Bituriges ruled over all of Gaul ca. 600 BC. Faced with overpopulation in their homeland, the Biturigian king Ambigatus sent his sister's sons Bellovesus and Segovesus in search of new territories to settle. Segovesus headed towards the Hercynian Forest, while Bellovesus is said to have led the Gallic invasion of northern Italy. Many Greek ceramics and amphoras imported from Massalia, as well as local productions of fine art pottery dated to the second part of the 6th century BC were found on the site Bourges, which, according to historian Venceslas Kruta, gives archeological credit to the essence of the tradition reported by Livy evoking the power of the people of the region well before his own time.

In the 1st century BC, the Bituriges Cubi were client of the Aedui as part of their confederation headed. During the Gallic Wars, they supported the Arverni in their fight against Caesar, and suffered great losses in the siege of their oppidum named Noviodunum, followed by their chief town Avaricum in 52 BC, the only oppidum in their territory spared by the scorched-earth tactics of Vercingetorix. They also took part in the defence of Alesia during the siege of the oppidum by the Romans. After the defeat of Vercingetorix, Rome had to suppress a Gallic revolt in the territory of the Bituriges in 51 BC. Their submission to Rome was reportedly quick, and they asked Caesar to intervene against their neighbours the Carnutes only a few weeks later.

Legacy 
A passage from Livy, summa imperii penes Biturges ('all the power in the hands of the Bituriges'), has become the motto of the city of Bourges.

See also
 List of peoples of Gaul
 Saint-Benoît-du-Sault

References

Primary sources

Bibliography 

 

 

 
Gauls
Tribes of pre-Roman Gaul
Tribes involved in the Gallic Wars
Historical Celtic peoples